Uihlein is a surname.
Notable people bearing it include:
August Uihlein (1842–1911), German-born American businessman
Joseph E. Uihlein (1875–1968), American businessman
Robert Uihlein, Jr. (1916–1976), American businessman
David Vogel Uihlein, Sr. (1920–2010), American heir and businessman
Lynde Bradley Uihlein (born 1945), American heiress and liberal philanthropist
Richard Uihlein (born 1945), American businessman
Wally Uihlein (born 1950), American golf businessman
David Vogel Uihlein, Jr. (fl. 1974 & fl. 2020), American heir, businessman and conservative philanthropist/activist
Peter Uihlein (born 1989), American golfer

See also
Uihlein Soccer Park
Herman Uihlein House